Old Mandarin or Early Mandarin was the speech of northern China during the Jurchen-ruled Jin dynasty and the Mongol-led Yuan dynasty (12th to 14th centuries). New genres of vernacular literature were based on this language, including verse, drama and story forms, such as the qu and sanqu.

The phonology of Old Mandarin has been inferred from the 'Phags-pa script, an alphabet created in 1269 for several languages of the Mongol empire, including Chinese, and from two rime dictionaries, the Menggu Ziyun (1308) and the Zhongyuan Yinyun (1324).  The rhyme books differ in some details but show many of the features characteristic of modern Mandarin dialects, such as the reduction and disappearance of final stops and the reorganization of the four tones of Middle Chinese.

Name 
The name "Mandarin", as a direct translation of the Chinese  ('language of the officials'), was initially applied to the lingua franca of the Ming and Qing dynasties, which was based on various northern dialects. It has since been extended to both Standard Chinese and related northern dialects from the 12th century to the present.

Sources 

China had a strong and conservative tradition of phonological description in the rime dictionaries and their elaboration in rime tables. For example, the phonological system of the 11th-century Guangyun was almost identical to that of the Qieyun of more than four centuries earlier, disguising changes in speech over the period.
A rare exception was Shao Yong's adaptation of the rime tables, without reference to the Qieyun tradition, to describe the phonology of 11th-century Kaifeng.

A side-effect of foreign rule of northern China between the 12th and 14th centuries was a weakening of many of the old traditions. New genres of vernacular literature such as the qu and sanqu poetry appeared, as well as descriptions of contemporary language that revealed how much the language had changed.

The first alphabetic writing system for Chinese was created by the Tibetan Buddhist monk and leader Drogön Chögyal Phagpa on the orders of the Mongol emperor Kublai Khan. His 'Phags-pa script, promulgated in 1269, was a vertical adaptation of the Tibetan alphabet initially aimed at Mongolian but later adapted to other languages of the empire, including Chinese. It saw limited use until the fall of the Yuan dynasty in 1368. The alphabet shows some influence of traditional phonology, in particular including voiced stops and fricatives that most scholars believe had disappeared from Mandarin dialects by that time. However, checked tone syllables (ending in the stops /p/, /t/ or /k/ in Middle Chinese) were all written with a glottal stop ending. (Other tones are not marked by the script.)

The Menggu Ziyun was a Chinese rime dictionary based on 'Phags-pa. The prefaces of the only extant manuscript are dated 1308, but the work is believed to be derived from earlier 'Phags-pa texts. The dictionary is believed to be based on Song dynasty rime dictionaries, particularly the Lǐbù yùnlüè issued by the Ministry of Rites in 1037. The front matter includes a list of 'Phags-pa letters mapped to the 36 initials of the Song dynasty rime table tradition, with further letters for vowels. The entries are grouped into 15 rime classes corresponding closely to the 16 broad rime classes of the tables. Within each rime class, entries are grouped by the 'Phags-pa spelling of the final and then by the four tones of Middle Chinese, the last of which is not indicated by the 'Phags-pa spelling.

A more radical departure from the rhyme table tradition was the Zhongyuan Yinyun, created by Zhōu Déqīng in 1324 as a guide to the rhyming conventions of qu, a new vernacular verse form. The entries are grouped into 19 rhyme classes each identified by a pair of exemplary characters. The rhyme classes are subdivided by tone and then into groups of homophones, with no other indication of pronunciation. The even tone ( píng) is divided in upper and lower tones called  yīnpíng and  yángpíng, respectively.

Phonology 
The phonology of Old Mandarin is most clearly defined in the Zhongyuan Yinyun. The 'Phags-pa script and the Menggu Ziyun tend to retain more traditional elements, but are useful in filling in the spartan description of the Zhongyuan Yinyun. The language shows many of the features characteristic of modern Mandarin dialects, such as the reduction and disappearance of final stop consonants and the reorganization of the Middle Chinese tones.

Initials 
In Middle Chinese, initial stops and affricates showed a three-way contrast between voiceless unaspirated, voiceless aspirated and voiced consonants. The voicing distinction disappeared in most Chinese varieties, with different effects on the initials and tones in each of the major groups. In Old Mandarin, Middle Chinese voiced stops and affricates became voiceless aspirates in the "even" tone and voiceless non-aspirates in others, a typical feature of modern Mandarin varieties. This distribution is also found in Shao Yong's 11th-century rhyme tables.

With the exception of the retroflex nasal, which merged with the dental nasal, the Late Middle Chinese retroflex stops and retroflex sibilants merged into a single series.

The initial /∅/ denotes a voiced laryngeal onset functioning as a zero initial.  It was almost in complementary distribution with the initial /ŋ/, and the two have merged in most modern dialects as a zero initial, [ŋ], [ɣ] or [n].
The initial /ʋ/ has also merged with the zero initial and the /w/ medial in the standard language.

The distinction between the dental and retroflex sibilants has persisted in northern Mandarin dialects, including that of Beijing, but the two series have merged in southwestern and southeastern dialects.
A more recent development in some dialects (including Beijing) is the merger of palatal allophones of dental sibilants and velars, yielding a palatal series (rendered j-, q- and x- in pinyin).

Finals 

The Late Middle Chinese rime tables divide finals between 16 rhyme classes (shè ), each described as either "inner" (nèi ) or "outer" (wài ), thought to indicate a close or open vowel respectively.  Each rhyme group was divided into four "divisions" (děng ), crosscut with a two-way division between "open mouth" (kāikǒu ) or "closed mouth" (hékǒu ), with the latter indicating labialisation of the syllable onset.

Although these categories are coarser than the finals of the Early Middle Chinese of the Qieyun, they are sufficient to account for the development to Old Mandarin. The LMC divisions are reflected in Old Mandarin by variation in the vowel, as well as the presence or absence of palatalization. Palatalization and lip rounding are represented by a medial glide, as in modern varieties.
Divisions III and IV are not distinguished by any of the varieties, and are marked with a palatal glide, except after retroflex initials.  Palatal glides also occur in open division II syllables with velar or laryngeal initials.

For example, the rhyme classes with nasal codas yield the following Old Mandarin finals:

The merger of the zēng and gěng rhyme classes is a characteristic feature of Mandarin dialects.
That merger, and that of the dàng and jiāng classes, was already reflected in Shao Yong's 11th-century rhyme tables.

The two sources yield very similar sets of finals, though they sometimes differ in which finals were considered to rhyme:

In syllables with labial initials, Middle Chinese -m codas had already dissimilated to -n before the Old Mandarin period.
The remaining -m codas merged with -n before the early 17th century, when the late Ming standard was described by European missionaries Matteo Ricci and Nicolas Trigault. The pairs -uŋ/-wəŋ and -juŋ/-yŋ had also merged by this time. However, the language still distinguished mid and open vowels in the pairs -jɛw/-jaw, -jɛn/-jan and -wɔn/-wan. These pairs had also merged by the time of Joseph Prémare's 1730 grammar. They are still distinguished in Wu and Gan and some nearby Lower Yangtze Mandarin dialects such as the Yangzhou dialect, where they are pronounced [kuõ] and [kuɛ̃] respectively.

Tones 
In Middle Chinese, syllables with vocalic or nasal codas could have one of three pitch contours, traditionally called "even", "rising" and "departing". Syllables with voiced initials tended to be pronounced with a lower pitch, and by the late Tang dynasty, each of the tones had split into two registers conditioned by the initials. When voicing was lost in all dialect groups except Wu and Old Xiang, this distinction became phonemic.

The Zhongyuan Yinyun shows the typical Mandarin rearrangement of the first three tone classes into four tones:
 the upper even tone, conditioned by Middle Chinese voiceless initials
 the lower even tone, conditioned by Middle Chinese voiced or nasal initials
 the rising tone (except for syllables with Middle Chinese voiced initials)
 the departing tone, including rising tone syllables with Middle Chinese voiced initials
Checked syllables are distributed across syllables with vocalic codas in other tones determined by the Middle Chinese initial:
 tone 2 in syllables with voiced obstruent initials
 tone 3 in syllables with voiceless initials except the glottal stop
 tone 4 in syllables with sonorant or glottal stop initials
Such syllables are placed after others of the same tone in the dictionary, perhaps to accommodate Old Mandarin dialects in which former checked syllables retained a final glottal stop as in modern northwestern and southeastern dialects.

Vocabulary 

The flourishing vernacular literature of the period also shows distinctively Mandarin vocabulary and syntax, though some, such as the third-person pronoun tā, can be traced back to the Tang dynasty.

Notes

References 

Works cited

Further reading

External links
 BabelStone: Phags-pa Script, by Andrew West.
 Zhongyuan Yinyun at the Internet Archive: part 1 and part 2.
 Zhongyuan Yinyun, at the Chinese Text Project.